The Nassau County Police Department is the law enforcement agency of Nassau County, New York.

History

In 1925, concerned about rising crime rates, the County Board of Supervisors voted to create the Nassau County Police Department, replacing a scattered system of constables and town and village police departments. (Some jurisdictions declined to join the police district, however, and have opted to maintain their own independent police forces to this day (i.e.: the Port Washington Police District). Consisting initially of Chief of Police (later Commissioner) Abram Skidmore, 55 officers and a fingerprint expert, the force grew to 450 officers by 1932 and reached 650 officers by the time Skidmore retired in 1945.

The expansion accelerated dramatically following World War II with the rapid suburbanization of the county. It reached 1,000 officers in six precincts by 1950. A seventh precinct was opened in 1955 and an eighth followed five years later. In the early 1970s, with crime and civil disorder in neighboring New York City and other cities a major concern, the force was boosted to its greatest strength, nearly 4,200 officers. Since then, it has declined to around 2,600, making it still one of the largest county police agencies in the United States.

In 1989 officers were equipped with 9mm SIG Sauer P226 semi-automatic pistols to replace older .38 Special revolvers.

Nevertheless, the department's reduced size has been a source of controversy, with the village of Mineola exploring the idea of seceding from the police district and establishing its own police force. On December 5, 2006, however, the village's voters decisively rejected the proposal, 2,936 to 1,288.

In October 2011, the Nassau County Legislature voted on a budget that had the effect of closing three of the eight precincts. In March 2012 the Levittown station was chosen to be the first to be reduced to a "Community Policing Center" followed by the 5th Precinct in Elmont, and 6th Precinct in Manhasset.  The 5th Precinct and 6th Precinct have since reopened.

The department is headed by a civilian commissioner, appointed by the county executive. On January 24, 2018, County Executive Laura Curran appointed Patrick Ryder, the former commanding Officer of the Asset Forfeiture & Intelligence Unit, as Commissioner. On February 26, 2018, after being unanimously confirmed by the Nassau County Legislature, Ryder was sworn in as Nassau County police commissioner.

In April 2019 the county announced an agreement had been reached between the Democrat County executive and Republican-controlled County legislature, and on April 10, 2019, the 6th Precinct in Manhasset and the 8th Precinct in Levittown were reopened, restoring the department to its original 8 precinct Size.

The NCPD's guiding philosophy is that it is a "service-oriented" police department, promoting the concept of the community as client, and the police as provider. (For example, officers will come to a citizen's home to take a crime report or complaint, rather than ask the citizen to come to the precinct.) Sociologist James Q. Wilson used the Nassau department as the exemplar of this approach in his classic 1968 study, Varieties of Police Behavior.

Equipment 
The department has historically been known to quickly embrace new technologies. The Marine Bureau began in 1933 with the gift of an 18-foot Chris Craft mahogany speedboat from the residents of Manhasset Bay. The Aviation Bureau followed a year later with the gift of a Stinson airplane from wealthy county residents. The aircraft was grounded by World War II, but the air unit was revived in 1968 with the purchase of four helicopters to assist in pursuits and medical evacuations. The elite Highway Patrol Bureau, which covers the Long Island Expressway and the Seaford-Oyster Bay Expressway and includes motorcycle officers, was founded in 1935. All police vehicles are now equipped with computer keyboards, and, since 1973, air conditioning.

In addition to these units, the department also maintains many features, such as a Detective Bureau, a police academy, a mounted unit, an arson/bomb squad, a hostage negotiation team, a citizen-based auxiliary police program, a bureau of special operations (SWAT and anti-crime combined) and an Emergency Services Unit (ESU), that are usually found only in the police departments of large cities. The department has also adopted its own system for computerized tracking of crime information known as NASSTAT, now called Strat-Com.

Traffic safety is a major department priority, given Nassau's relative lack of public transportation and its perpetually clogged roads and highways. A unique feature of the department is its Children's Safety Town, an actual village built to 1/3 scale that includes paved streets, two intersections equipped with traffic signals, an overpass, two tunnels, a simulated railroad crossing and 21 buildings. Managed by the department's Traffic Safety Unit, it allows the NCPD to teach traffic and bicycle safety to grade schoolers under controlled conditions.

In 1989, concerned about the increasingly heavy weaponry being carried by criminals, the NCPD was among the first police departments in the country to trade their venerable 6 shot .38 Smith & Wesson revolvers for the 15-round, nine-millimeter SIG P226 semi-automatic pistol. More recently, the department announced it is switching over to the SIG P229 and SIG P226, chambered for .40 S&W with the Double Action Kellerman (DAK) trigger and integral accessory rail as the new standard firearm. Also, officers are re-equipping with expandable batons to replace the straight wooden nightstick.

In 1995, the NCPD became the largest police department in the country to that time, and the first in New York State, to allow its officers to work a steady 10- or 12-hour shift, rather than a rotating 8-hour shift commencing at a different time each week. In early 2007, the NCPD announced that 207 marked patrol vehicles would be equipped with Global Positioning System (GPS) devices, allowing "live" views of the location of all active units.

In late 2006, the department undertook "Operation Gotcha," deploying a new technology that scans the license plate numbers of passing vehicles directly into a mobile crime computer, allowing the immediate apprehension of drivers operating vehicles with expired licenses, suspended registrations or with outstanding arrest warrants. The technology allows the scanning of literally thousands of plates in a single shift.

Firearms 
 SIG Sauer P226 DAK and SIG Sauer P229 DAK, both in .40 S&W—officers have their choice and both weapons replaced older 9mm SIG Sauer P226 pistols.
 SIG Sauer SIGM400

Police vehicles 
In the 1990s, the department exclusively used Ford Crown Victorias and Chevrolet Caprices as their main patrol cars. Mounted units used Chevrolet Suburbans.

In 2003, the department switched to the 2000–2005 Chevrolet Impala 9C1. The Ford Crown Victoria was still purchased, albeit in smaller quantities. The department favored the "CVPI" due to the rear-wheel drive and V8 configuration. The department switched back to the Crown Victoria in 2006. Few Impalas are still in service in 2019.

Model year 2006–2010 Dodge Chargers were tested for highway patrol use. The Dodge Charger was a performance leader; however, due to maintenance costs, the department did not use many and few are still in service as of 2018.
 
The department tried Chevrolet Tahoes in 2010 and they were given to certain sectors. The vehicle proved to be a strong patrol car with good all-weather capability and was a valuable asset during Hurricane Sandy.  The Chevrolet Caprice 9C1 was tried out in 2014 and was given to precincts and highway patrol.

The mounted unit operates Chevrolet Tahoes and Suburbans. Highway patrol utilizes the Ford Police Interceptor, Ford Crown Victoria, Chevrolet Caprice and Dodge Charger. The Auxiliary Police unit uses a variety of ex-marked Nassau County Police cars, the majority of which being Ford Crown Victorias and Chevrolet Impalas.

Nassau County ended up switching to the Ford Utility Interceptor as their main choice for RMP. Today, the Ford Utility Interceptor is the most widely used car in the fleet.

Rank structure
Promotion to the ranks of sergeant, lieutenant, and police captain are made via competitive civil service examinations. Promotion to the ranks of detective, detective sergeant, detective lieutenant, detective captain,  deputy inspector, inspector and chief are made at the discretion of the police commissioner.

Other staff

The Nassau County Police Department also employs School Crossing Guards, Communication/911 operators, Police Service Aids, Clerk/Typists, Mechanics and Public Safety Officers.

Auxiliary Police

The Nassau County Auxiliary Police is a unit of the Nassau County Police Department.  These volunteer police officers are assigned to 1 of 36 local community units and perform routine patrols of the neighborhood and provide traffic control for local parades, races, other community events and assist the Police Department as needed.   Auxiliary Police officers are empowered to make arrests for crimes that occur in their presence.

Nassau County Auxiliary Police officers must attend and complete a 130-hour, 36-session training course, which is taught by state-certified instructors at the Nassau County Police Academy. Emergency Medical Technician (EMT) training is also available to all officers after certain criteria are met. Basic academy training includes: peace officer powers, New York State Penal Law, hazardous materials awareness, baton training, blood-borne pathogens, basic first aid/CPR, traffic and pedestrian control, and response to critical incidents.

Auxiliary Police officers are certified by the NYS Division of Criminal Justice Services (DCJS) as "Peace Officers" and are registered in the NYS DCJS registry of peace officers.

Emergency Ambulance Bureau

In addition to police officers, the department also employs hundreds of civilian Police Medics (PMs) who consist of Critical Care Emergency Medical Technicians (EMT-CCs) and Paramedics. The title “police medic“ is the most recent title given to these employees, who were previously known as “Ambulance medical technicians“ (AMT's).

Unlike most jurisdictions, where emergency medical response and ambulance transport are functions performed primarily by a fire department or other organizations, in Nassau County, the police department and local volunteer fire departments share this responsibility. Nassau is one of the few police agencies in New York State that trains all of its police officers to provide emergency medical services to assist the Police Medics. Nassau Police ambulances are manned by gray and blue uniformed Police Medics rather than police officers.

While it is important to note that Police Medics are civilian employees of the police department, they do have additional equipment and powers when compared to other paramedics. Most Police Medics carry handcuffs and pepper spray, and all Police Medics are issued bulletproof vests. Unlike other paramedics, Police Medics are often placed directly into police situations, including many violent situations that most paramedics would stage away from until the scene was secure. The volunteer fire departments and private ambulance companies who work public 911 contracts in Nassau rely on the Police Medics to handle all violent patients, including psychiatric patients, criminals who require medical treatment, prisoners in need of medical treatment (from the county holding cells or the county jail), and others. Unlike its neighboring municipalities, all psychiatric patients in Nassau go to the hospital by ambulance, due to the county having Police Medics on duty 24/7. In Suffolk or NYC, more violent or dangerous patients would often be taken by police cars instead.

The department operates 18-26 Demers Type I and Braun Type-III modular-style ambulances on any given day, each designated a four digit unit number of the pattern 23xx. For frontline ambulances, the final number matches the precinct the ambulance is assigned to. For example, an ambulance assigned to the fourth precinct would follow this model: 23x4. The third number is chosen at the discretion of headquarters and can be any single digit number, so long as an ambulance with that designation is not already in service. Spare ambulances do not follow this system. All ambulances are advanced life support ambulances and carry heart monitors, defibrillators, oxygen, trauma dressings, intubation kits, IV and IO needles and tubing, Advanced Life Support medications and other vital medical equipment. In mid 2019, NCPD deployed automated CPR devices (specifically the brand "LifeArm") to all its ambulances. These had previously been limited to supervisors vehicles only, due to the expense. However given that police medics ride solo, the dangers CPR poses to an EMS provider while an ambulance is moving, and the effectiveness of automated CPR, the county decided to use asset forfeiture funds to purchase enough additional devices so that all its ambulances could have one. As of October 2019 the deployment of these devices was reported to be complete.

The NCPD Emergency Ambulance Bureau consists of five ranks: Police Medic, Police Medic Supervisor, Police Medic Coordinator, Assistant Bureau director, and Bureau director. As Police Medics are civilian members of the department, they have no rank equivalency to sworn members of the Force (Police Officers), however the lowest rank ever allowed to oversee the bureau was a Deputy Inspector, and in more recent times the bureau was overseen by a full Inspector. At the present time, the bureau is overseen by the chiefs within the patrol division and is considered a part of the patrol division. The Bureau director of the Emergency Ambulance Bureau has been described in the past to function similarly to an inspector or even a deputy chief.

The NCPD Emergency Ambulance Bureau covers over 60,000 calls per year with 22 units operating.

A small number of EAB personnel are designated "Tactical Medics", specially trained and equipped to operate with the NCPD's Bureau of Special Operations to rescue wounded officers and civilians under fire.

After finding the abandoned bodies of a number of newborn children, Nassau AMT Timothy Jaccard and several of his colleagues in the Emergency Ambulance Bureau founded the AMT Children of Hope Foundation, to give these children proper funerals and dignified burials.

Personnel issues
Nassau officers (along with their counterparts in the Suffolk County Police Department), have long been known for having among the highest police pay and benefit packages in the nation, especially when compared with the New York Police Department. In December 2022, County officials and the union representing Nassau Police officers agreed on an -year contract, which would run retroactively from Jan. 1, 2018 until July 1, 2026, and increase the top base pay for officers from $122,000 to $141,000. (Not including overtime, night differential, longevity pay, $3,000 per officer for wearing body cams and other benefits.) Starting pay for new officers would also be increased from $35,000 to $37,333.

Many New York City police officers apply for positions in the Nassau force because of this disparity. Failure rates of NYPD officers in the Nassau Police Academy are about the same as non-police officer candidates. Typically, between one-third and one-half of the recruits in every Nassau police academy class are former city officers. A police exam took place in January 2018 and a large class of 185 recruits (including 50 former NYPD officers) entered the police academy in December 2020.

Police pay has been a contentious issue in the county for many years. In 2000, the state formed a financial oversight authority to monitor the county's budget. On January 27, 2011, after several public warnings, the authority moved to take control of the county's finances. Budgetary issues have curtailed hiring severely. On May 17, 2013, a class of only 37 recruits was sworn into the police academy, the first class since 48 entered in 2004 and 50 recruits in 2008.

Hiring on the Nassau force has long been a bone of contention, with African Americans, Hispanics and other groups, often supported by the U.S. Justice Department, claiming the hiring process is biased toward white males. The county has denied any intentional discrimination, and there have been repeated recruiting drives aimed at convincing more minorities to take the police exam, which itself has been repeatedly redesigned with the aim of making it easier. White candidates have disputed this, claiming the test is now biased against them. These controversies have led to numerous lawsuits, which have repeatedly delayed hiring and account in part for the force's shrinking size.

Another major point of contention between the county government and the police union in recent years has been inadequate police academy training facilities. After being located for several years in a converted elementary school in Williston Park, the academy facilities were "temporarily" relocated for a decade in trailers on the grounds of the county jail in East Meadow. In May 2006, the Suozzi administration announced the academy would move into yet another converted school, this one in Massapequa. A purpose-built police academy, located on the campus of Nassau County Community College in Uniondale, opened in 2021.

Notable cases
The Nassau County Police investigated the hunt for The Honeymoon Killers Raymond Fernandez and Martha Beck in the late 1940s, the Weinberger kidnapping of 1956 (on which the 2002 Robert De Niro film City by the Sea was very loosely based), the 1974 kidnapping of Jack Teich, the 1986 murder of yeshiva student Chaim Weiss, the crash of Avianca Flight 52 in Cove Neck in 1990, the Joey Buttafuoco/Amy Fisher imbroglio, and the shootings committed aboard a Long Island Rail Road commuter train by Colin Ferguson in 1993. Among the NCPD's few large-scale, high-profile security events have been the 1998 Goodwill Games, which took place largely in Nassau County, and the third 2008 presidential debate, which took place at Hofstra University in Hempstead. Nassau officers also participated in the recovery effort at the World Trade Center site in September 2001.

Fallen officers
In the history of the Nassau County Police Department, 35 police officers have died while on duty.

In popular culture
 The short-lived CBS sitcom Kevin Can Wait told the story of Kevin Gable, a retired Nassau County cop living in Massapequa, who later started a private security company.
 The 1985 film Compromising Positions, starring Susan Sarandon, Raul Julia, and Edward Herrmann, features the NCPD.

See also

 List of law enforcement agencies in New York
 List of law enforcement agencies on Long Island

References

External links

Nassau County Auxiliary Police website
Nassau County Police Marine Bureau website
Nassau County Police Benevolent Association website
FBI Famous Cases: The Weinberger Kidnapping
AMT Children of Hope Foundation

Nassau County, New York
County police departments of New York (state)
Law enforcement in the New York metropolitan area
1925 establishments in New York (state)